Seth Lee is an American actor best known for his work as young Christian Wolff in the Warner Brothers film The Accountant.

Early life 
Lee was born in Austin, Texas, on January 17, 2003 and began his career in entertainment at the age of 7 after chance meeting with Ernie Reyes Jr (Teenage Mutant Ninja Turtles, The Rundown). After watching some of Reyes's films with martial arts routines, Lee began taking acting classes along with martial arts, stunts, and gymnastics. Lee won three world titles and holds multiple black belts.

Career 
After getting his start in a small role in Spy Kids 4, Lee began booking local commercials, print campaigns, and short films before gaining his first television credit as Young Dennis on It’s Always Sunny in Philadelphia. Lee's big break in acting came portraying the younger version of Ben Affleck’s character in the film The Accountant in which he was praised for his portrayal of a child with autism; he later received the Young Artist Award and Young Entertainer award for Best Supporting Teen Actor in a Feature Film. 

Lee then joined the Ghetto Film School as the youngest in the Fellows program for his class graduating in 2019. Lee has written and directed several short films and music videos, was able to pitch a pilot he wrote to executives at FX and had another film he directed screened for executives at NBC Universal. Lee also appeared in the film Runt.

Filmography

Film

Television

Shorts

Awards

References

External links 

2003 births
Living people
21st-century American male actors